The Diocese of Créteil (Latin: Dioecesis Christoliensis; French: Diocèse de Créteil) is a Latin Church ecclesiastical territory or diocese of the Catholic Church in France. Erected in 1966 from a subdivision of the Archdiocese of Paris and the Diocese of Versailles, the Diocese of Créteil remains a suffragan diocese in the ecclesiastical province of the metropolitan Archdiocese of Paris.

Ordinaries 
Robert Marie-Joseph François de Provenchères (9 October 1966 – 13 August 1981)
François-Victor-Marie Frétellière, P.S.S. (13 August 1981 – 3 May 1997)
Daniel Labille (25 March 1998 – 4 September 2007)
Michel Santier (4 September 2007 – 9 January 2021)
Dominique Blanchet (9 January 2021 – present)

See also 
Catholic Church in France

References

External links 
  Centre national des Archives de l'Église de France, L’Épiscopat francais depuis 1919
 

Creteil
1966 establishments in France